The following tables show state-by-state results in the Australian House of Representatives at the 2007 federal election, 83 Labor, 65 coalition (55 Liberal, 10 National), 2 independent. Detailed results for all 150 seats are also available. The Nationals were reduced to nine seats and the coalition to 64 when independent Rob Oakeshott won the 2008 Lyne by-election.


Australia

New South Wales

Independents: Tony Windsor

Liberal to Labor: Bennelong, Dobell, Eden-Monaro, Lindsay, Parramatta (notional), Robertson

National to Labor: Page

Independent to National: Calare

Gwydir (National) was abolished in the last redistribution. Liberal-held Macquarie, a notionally Labor seat, was also won by the Labor Party.

Victoria

Liberal to Labor: Corangamite, Deakin.

Queensland

Independents: Bob Katter

Liberal to Labor: Blair, Bonner, Forde, Leichhardt, Longman, Moreton, Petrie

National to Labor: Flynn (notional), Dawson.

Western Australia

Labor to Liberal: Cowan, Swan

Liberal to Labor: Hasluck.

South Australia

Liberal to Labor: Kingston, Makin, Wakefield.

Tasmania

Liberal to Labor: Bass, Braddon.

Territories

Australian Capital Territory

Northern Territory

CLP to Labor: Solomon.

See also
 Post-election pendulum for the Australian federal election, 2007
 Members of the Australian House of Representatives, 2007–2010
 Results of the Australian federal election, 2007 (Senate)

Notes

References

External links
Post-2004 election maps, pre-redistribution

2007 elections in Australia
House of Representatives 2007